Dmitrii Ivanovich Sosnowsky was a Soviet botanist.

References

1886 births
1953 deaths
People from Gyumri
Soviet botanists
Recipients of the Order of Lenin
Odesa University alumni